Jonathan Mark Ralston (born July 13, 1959) is an American journalist, political commentator, and former talk show host. His show, Ralston Live, was seen each weekday on the two Nevada PBS stations in Las Vegas and Reno until his show was discontinued on June 21, 2016.

In 2017, Ralston launched The Nevada Independent (TNI), a nonprofit online news site devoted to Nevada business and government.

Early life and education
Ralston was born in Morristown, New Jersey and grew up in Buffalo, New York, where he attended Williamsville South High School. He received a Bachelor of Arts in English from Cornell University in 1981 and an Master of Arts in journalism from the University of Michigan in 1983.

Career 
After completing his master's degree, Ralston moved to Las Vegas, Nevada, to become a night-time police reporter for the Las Vegas Review-Journal in 1984. In 1986, he was assigned to cover politics and in 1989, he became a full-time political columnist for that paper. In 1999, he sold his newsletter side project to Greenspun Media Group and began writing for the Las Vegas Sun, one of their newspapers. His book, The Anointed One: An Inside Look At Nevada Politics, was published in September 2000. It recounted how Kenny Guinn won his first election, the Nevada governor's race in 1998, with backing from the casino industry and political insiders.

In September 2012, Ralston left the Las Vegas Sun. In 2014, Ralston appeared as an actor in the Amazon original series Alpha House. His KSNV Ralston Reports TV show ended on December 12, 2014. On January 7, 2015, he began writing for the Reno Gazette-Journal. As of 2016, he was primarily known in Nevada for his television show, Ralston Live, a different email newsletter called Flash, and a twice-weekly column for the Reno Gazette-Journal. His show was discontinued on June 21, 2016 by KLVX and KNPB.

Nevada election predictions and analysis
Ralston is known nationally for his analysis of Nevada elections, especially based upon early voting results. He accurately predicted both the presidential election in Nevada and the Nevada Senate race in 2016 on the basis of early voting data. In 2020, he accurately predicted the presidential election in Nevada and the two Las Vegas-area House races in which he offered predictions. In 2022, he accurately predicted the Nevada Senate race, two of the three Las Vegas-area House races, the gubernatorial race, the lieutenant gubernatorial election, the Secretary of State race, the Attorney General election, the Treasurer race, and the Controller race.

2016 Nevada Democratic state convention
Reporting on the Nevada Democratic state convention in 2016, Ralston tweeted that supporters of U.S. Senator Bernie Sanders had thrown chairs. The Associated Press filed a similar report. NPR originally repeated Ralston's reporting as did other media outlets, but removed it after only being able to find evidence of a chair being lifted in the air but not of one being thrown. Snopes, a website that documents and debunks urban legends and rumors, identified Ralston as the source for the statement that Sanders supporters had thrown chairs and said there was no evidence to support it.

The Nevada Independent
Ralston's plans to launch a digital news publication in early 2017 called The Nevada Independent were first reported in November 2016. The site launched on January 17, 2017 and Ralston announced he would disclose the sources of all its donations.

References

External links
 
 
 

1959 births
Living people
20th-century American male writers
20th-century American non-fiction writers
21st-century American non-fiction writers
American broadcast news analysts
American male actors
American male journalists
American political commentators
American political writers
American television talk show hosts
Cornell University alumni
Journalists from Nevada
Journalists from New York (state)
Nevada Independents
PBS people
University of Michigan alumni
21st-century American male writers